Dot Goes to Hollywood is a 1987 Australian film directed by Yoram Gross. It was released in DVD (Region 4 format) in 2014.

Plot
Yoram Gross' eighth Dot movie opens in Australia with Dot and a koala named Gumley dancing and singing in the streets. There is evidence of an epidemic, revealed to be an eye disease, which is spreading fast among the koalas, causing blindness and death. Gumley has contracted the disease, and he and Dot are trying to raise money to pay for an operation, but they are unsuccessful. A kangaroo named Dosey suggests that Dot goes to Hollywood, where she will be able to raise the money in no time.
 
In Hollywood, Dot meets many famous people and goes to an audition, which she hopes will lead to earning some money. During her audition, Gumley is discovered and taken to the zoo. The zoo's vet discovers that Gumley is sick with the disease, but the zoo cannot afford to pay for the operation either.

Gumley is held captive until Dot arrives at the zoo and helps him escape. While hiding in the zoo, Gumley's condition worsens. After Dot wins a contest, the vet agrees to operate on Gumley's eyes. Dot practices her singing while Gumley undergoes surgery. The first operation does not go well, but another procedure in two days later succeeds in curing Gumley.

Gumley returns to Dot during a performance, and they sing together along with other characters.

Footage is featured from the films The New Adventures of Tarzan, Moviestruck, Something to Sing About, Little Princess, and Flying Deuces.

Cast
 Robyn Moore as Dot, Dosey Face, misc.
 Keith Scott as Gumley, Grumblebones, Laurel and Hardy, misc.

References

External links

Dot Goes to Hollywood at Oz Movies

1987 films
1980s Australian animated films
1980s children's animated films
1980s musical films
Animated films about koalas
Australian animated feature films
Australian children's adventure films
Australian children's musical films
Films based on children's books
Films directed by Yoram Gross
Films scored by Guy Gross
Films with live action and animation
1980s English-language films
1980s Australian films
Flying Bark Productions films